Regular Show: The Movie is a 2015 American animated science fiction comedy film based on the animated series Regular Show. Produced by Cartoon Network Studios, the film was directed by J. G. Quintel and features the voices of William Salyers, Quintel, Sam Marin, and Mark Hamill reprising their respective roles from the series, with Jason Mantzoukas and David Koechner joining the cast. The film follows Mordecai and Rigby, along with their groundskeeping co-workers Benson, Pops, Muscle Man, Hi-Five Ghost and Skips, as they embark on a mission to save the universe, and their friendship, from a vengeful volleyball coach.

The film premiered on August 14, 2015, at The Downtown Independent theater in Los Angeles, where it was shown until August 20, 2015. The film was released digitally on September 1, 2015, on DVD on October 13, 2015, and ultimately had its television premiere on November 25, 2015, on Cartoon Network. The events of the film take place during the seventh season of the show. Regular Show: The Movie was the first Cartoon Network original film since 2009's Ed, Edd n Eddy's Big Picture Show.

Plot

In the distant future, Rigby leads Benson, Skips, Hi-Five Ghost, Muscle Man, and Pops against a madman named Mr. Ross, who is plotting to erase all of time. They find Mr. Ross' weapon is guarded by a cyborg version of Mordecai, who attempts to kill Rigby for a transgression he did in the past. The entire team is killed except for Rigby, who escapes using a timeship to travel to the past, though not before Mordecai mortally shoots him.

In the present, Mordecai and Rigby barely convince Benson not to fire them after running late due to Rigby's idea to get breakfast burritos. When the timeship crash lands in the park, future Rigby appears to tell Mordecai, Rigby and their co-workers that when Mordecai and Rigby were in high school, they built a time machine that backfired and created a "Time-nado", a tornado with the ability to travel through space and time and create portals through time, which was later harnessed and weaponized by their former science teacher and volleyball coach, Mr. Ross, who was held responsible for the incident and arrested. Before dying, future Rigby also reveals future Mordecai shot him, shocking the group, and tells Rigby that he will soon have to reveal a secret from his past to save the universe, even if it costs him his friendship with Mordecai. When questioned for details, Mordecai explains they created the time machine because Rigby got into their dream college, College University, but he did not.

After preparing for the mission, the employees use the timeship to travel back in time, but damage the ship's engines in the process. Skips, Muscle Man, and Hi-Five Ghost stay behind to fix them, while the others go to Mordecai and Rigby's old high school to destroy the time machine that their past selves are working on with past Mr. Ross, who is angry at Rigby for costing his volleyball team the championship but was forced to let him do an extra credit assignment to pass his class. After an encounter with the volleyball team, who mistake Benson and Pops for spies from a rival school, Mordecai and Rigby meet their past selves and convince past Rigby to make a model volcano instead.

Believing their mission to be over, the group returns to the timeship, only to find the repairs stalled due to an encounter with Muscle Man and Hi-Five Ghost's past selves. Complicating matters further is that temporal ruptures begin appearing just as the repairs are finished. Rigby, who had slipped away earlier, informs the group that his and Mordecai's past selves are heading to the high school to finish a second time machine future Mr. Ross planted (it is unknown where and how he obtained it). The employees race back to the school but are held up by Mr. Ross and future Mordecai, allowing past Mordecai and past Rigby to botch the second time machine and create the Time-nado. Seeing that Rigby is still unwilling to reveal the truth, Mr. Ross forces Rigby to admit the truth while holding Mordecai hostage: he never got into College University, but Mordecai did; not wanting to lose his best friend, Rigby faked Mordecai's rejection letter, thus ruining his promising future. Mr. Ross then tries to kill Mordecai with a volleyball bomb, but future Mordecai, having a change of heart, jumps into the bomb's path, forcing Mr. Ross to retreat.

Enraged at Rigby's duplicity, Mordecai ends his friendship with him, prompting a heartbroken Rigby to run off with the timeship and leave the group behind. Before dying, future Mordecai gives his present self his timeship and instructs him to patch things up, saying what Rigby did was no excuse to side with Mr. Ross. As the group tries to rebound, a distress call from future Gene the Vending Machine prompts them to help out. Meanwhile, after a suicide attempt to fly into the Sun, Rigby encounters Father Time, who is falling apart due to the Time-nado, and convinces Rigby to apologize to Mordecai. Rigby heads to the future and races back to the Time-nado space station, but gets intercepted along with Mordecai by Mr. Ross at the temporal crystal power core. With Techmo's help, they manage to defeat Ross and restore their friendship before using the plutonium from Mordecai's timeship to destroy the Time-nado. Meanwhile, past Rigby apologizes to past Mr. Ross before the latter is arrested and imprisoned for life, ending the feud between them.

Returning to the present, Mordecai and Rigby agree that, despite how cool their future selves turned out, they will not let their friendship degrade into trying to kill each other, which alters the future and erases their dead future selves. The following day, as Benson catches them out of the park, the pair race back in the timeship from a fast food place with Rigby saying they will "never be late again" before using the timeship to travel back in time to the point before Benson catches them.

Voice cast
 William Salyers as Rigby
 J. G. Quintel as Mordecai, Hi-Five Ghost
 Sam Marin as Pops, Benson, Muscle Man
 Mark Hamill as Skips
 Jason Mantzoukas as Mr. Ross
 David Koechner as Principal Dean
 Minty Lewis as Eileen
 Roger Craig Smith as Francis Jablonski, Frank Smith, Fast Food Guy
 Ali Hillis as Ship Computer, Barbara
 Kurtwood Smith as Gene
 Eddie Pepitone as Sherm
 Paul F. Tompkins as Gino
 Fred Tatasciore as Father Time, Security Guard, Timenado Mechanic, Willy, News Reporter
 Steve Blum as Techmo, Brit, Commander, TV Game
 Janie Haddad as Margaret Smith

Production
The film was first announced in February 2015 during the Cartoon Network upfront. Series creator J. G. Quintel announced on June 11, 2015, via Twitter that the production of the film had been completed. A trailer for the film was shown at the 2015 Comic Con International event on July 10, 2015 and was later released online on July 12, 2015. Despite the film being announced in February 2015, the film began production in 2014.

During production of the fourth season, the network asked the creator if he would like to do a forty-minute special episode. Quintel turned  down the offer and asked to do a film instead. The network agreed. The idea was then put into development.

Quintel confirmed that the film is canon to the events of the show, and is set between the first two episodes of season seven, "Dumptown U.S.A." and "The Parkie Awards".

The sixth season of Regular Show was affected by the film. It was set to have 40 episodes, but due to the production of the film, only 31 were produced. Season seven featured 39 episodes.

Soundtrack
The soundtrack for the film featured three real-life songs including, "March of the Swivel Heads", "The Future's So Bright, I Gotta Wear Shades" and "Pale Blue Eyes".

Release

Theatrical release
The film first screened at the L.A. Downtown Independent on August 14, 2015, and continued to screen until August 20, 2015. The film also screened at select Alamo Drafthouse Cinemas across the United States and it had a select showtime at the SVA Theatre of New York and at the Cinema Montrereal CANADA during October 2015.

Television premiere
Regular Show: The Movie premiered on Cartoon Network United States and Cartoon Network Canada on November 25, 2015. It premiered on Cartoon Network in the United Kingdom and Ireland and Cartoon Network in Australia and New Zealand on November 28, 2015. The film premiered in Asia (including Philippines) on November 30, 2015, and in Central and Latin America on December 7, 2015. The film premiered in France on December 18, 2015, on Cartoon Network.

Home media release
The film was released on digital platforms such as iTunes and Google Play Movies & TV on September 1, 2015. The movie was later released to DVD by Warner Home Video on October 13, 2015. It includes an audio commentary, deleted scenes, movie animatics, the trailer, original board pitch, concept art and movie art galleries. Is estimated to have grossed $151,389 in domestic DVD sales. The  movie is  available on HBO Max.

Reception

Critical response
Emily Ashby of Common Sense Media said in her review, "Regular Show: The Movie is full of far-fetched scenarios and story tangents. There's a lot of cartoon violence, including some fistfights, explosions, the use of hand-held blasters, and the disintegration of some characters. Language is marginal ("stupid," "butt," and the like), and the characters sometimes act on selfish or vengeful urges. That said, a main character realizes when his actions affect others in a negative way and attempts to set things right in the end." Felix Vasquez Jr. of Cinema Crazed called it "a great treat for devotees of the series; it’s simple, very entertaining, and never loses sight of what makes the show so excellent."

Ratings
The movie was watched by 2.17 million viewers and received a 0.5 rating in adults 18-49.

References

External links

 
 

2010s American animated films
2010s science fiction comedy films
Regular Show
American buddy films
2010s buddy films
Animated buddy films
Direct-to-video animated films
Films scored by Mark Mothersbaugh
Animated films based on animated series
2015 animated films
2015 films
Films about raccoons
Cartoon Network Studios animated films
Animated films about birds
Animated films about friendship
Animated films about time travel
Films directed by J. G. Quintel
American children's animated comic science fiction films
American children's animated science fantasy films
2010s children's animated films
2010s children's fantasy films
2015 directorial debut films
2015 comedy films
2010s English-language films